Yelizavetino is a rural locality (a selo) in Filippenkovskoye Rural Settlement, Buturlinovsky District, Voronezh Oblast, Russia. The population was 488 as of 2010. There are 7 streets.

Geography 
Yelizavetino is located 20 km southeast of Buturlinovka (the district's administrative centre) by road. Filippenkovo is the nearest rural locality.

References 

Rural localities in Buturlinovsky District